Nathan Miller (March 20, 1743 – May 20, 1790) was an American shipbuilder and merchant from Rhode Island. He was a delegate for Rhode Island to the Confederation Congress in 1788. Although reappointed to the Congress in 1789, he did not attend that year.

Born in Warren, Rhode Island, Miller attended private school and became a shipbuilder and merchant. He served as a member of the Rhode Island Legislature from 1772 to 1774, and in 1780, 1782, 1783, and 1790. In 1772, he was also commissioned a brigadier general in the Rhode Island Militia, serving in this capacity until 1778, although having duties "of an administrative nature, rather than as a field general".

On January 8, 1764, Miller married Rebecca Barton, with whom he had four children. Miller died in Warren at the age of 47.

References

 “American Generals of the Revolutionary War: a Biographical Dictionary.” American Generals of the Revolutionary War: a Biographical Dictionary, by Robert P. Broadwater, Mcfarland, 2012, pp. 89–89.
 “Diary of Colonel Israel Angell, Commanding the Second Rhode Island.” Diary of Colonel Israel Angell, Commanding the Second Rhode Island, by Israel Angell, Hardpress Publishing, 2012, pp. 52–54.
 “History of Warren, Rhode Island, in the War of the Revolution, 1776-1783.” History of Warren, Rhode Island, in the War of the Revolution, 1776-1783, by Virginia Baker, Hardpress Publishing, 2012.

1743 births
1790 deaths
Continental Congressmen from Rhode Island
18th-century American politicians
Militia generals in the American Revolution
Rhode Island militiamen in the American Revolution